Anton Walter Smetak  (Zurich, Switzerland, 13 February 1913 – Salvador, Brazil, 30 May 1984) was a Swiss-born musician, composer, writer, sculptor and producer of musical instruments.

Life and works 

Walter Smetak was born in Zurich of Czech origin and migrated to Brazil in 1937. He was a composer and inventor of instruments with which he would then play and conduct. He was a professor of composition at the Federal University of Bahia (UFBA) School of Music from 1957 to 1984. 

Relatively unknown, he is considered a forerunner and early influence on the musicians and artists who would form the core of Tropicalia, such as Caetano Veloso, Gilberto Gil, Tom Zé and Torquato Neto. One of his best known works is the experimental album titled Smetak, released in Brazil in 1974. Deeply involved in the Brazilian music scene of the 1960s and 1970s, Smetak collaborated with Gilberto Gil, Tom Zé, Uakti and others. The group Uakti, one of the world's most important groups that employed original instruments, was strongly inspired by Smetak's teaching, since its founder Marco Antonio Guimarães was his pupil. He died in Salvador in 1984.

References

1913 births
1984 deaths
Brazilian male composers
Brazilian people of Czech descent
20th-century male musicians
Swiss emigrants to Brazil